Lasiodiscus fasciculiflorus is a species of shrub or small tree in the family Rhamnaceae that is native to forests of the West African tropics. It occurs from Sierra Leone to Nigeria and the D.R.C. The bark is used in medicine to treat various ailments.

References

Trees of Africa
fasciculiflorus